Jiří Tlustý (born 16 March 1988) is a Czech former professional ice hockey left winger. He was originally a first-round draft pick of the Toronto Maple Leafs in the 2006 NHL Entry Draft, and split time between the Maple Leafs and the Toronto Marlies of the American Hockey League (AHL) until he was traded to the Carolina Hurricanes in December 2009. Tlustý was also drafted by Atlant Moscow of the Kontinental Hockey League (KHL) on 1 June 2009, 43rd overall.

Playing career

Amateur 
As a youth, Tlustý played in the 2002 Quebec International Pee-Wee Hockey Tournament with a team from Chomutov.

Whilst playing for HC Kladno in his native Czech Republic, Tlustý was drafted in the first round, 13th overall, by the Toronto Maple Leafs at the 2006 NHL Entry Draft. On 14 July, several weeks after his selection, Tlustý signed a three-year, entry-level contract with the Maple Leafs, wearing jersey number 41 in the team's training camp. On 25 September, he was assigned to the Toronto Marlies, the Maple Leafs' American Hockey League (AHL) affiliate, where he began his professional career by scoring three goals and one assist in six games to begin the 2006–07 season. On 23 October, however, he was assigned to the Sault Ste. Marie Greyhounds to begin his major junior career.

Tlustý was assigned to Sault Ste. Marie of the Ontario Hockey League (OHL) for the 2006–07 season, the holders of his major junior playing rights. In Tlustý's first 13 games of his OHL career, he sustained a high-ankle sprain that kept him out of the lineup for nearly six weeks as he attended treatment in Toronto. The injury also kept him from joining the Czech junior team at the 2007 World Junior Championships after initially being named to the pre-tournament roster.

Tlustý made his return to the Greyhounds lineup in mid-January 2007, finishing his first season in the OHL with 13 goals, 21 assists for 34 points in 37 games. With Tlustý back in the lineup, the Greyhounds made a strong finish leading into the playoffs and scored an upset in the first round, eliminating the Saginaw Spirit in six games. In the next round, the team faced the London Knights, ultimately losing in seven games. In the playoffs, Tlustý excelled, scoring nine goals and eight assists for 17 points in just 13 games.

Professional 
Ahead of the 2007–08 season, Tlustý attended the Maple Leafs' prospect camp tournament, where he played in all four tournament games, scoring three goals and adding one assist for four points. After the prospects' camp, Tlustý then attended the Maple Leafs' training camp and participated in the pre-season action. He played five games in the pre-season, recording one assist and eventually making the final cuts before ultimately being assigned to the AHL again. He played in five games in the AHL, scoring one goal and two assists, before being called-up to the NHL for the first time. On 25 October, he made his NHL debut in a game against the Pittsburgh Penguins, scoring two goals. His first came off a shot from Alexander Steen that deflected off of Tlustý's backside and into the net. Thirty-five seconds later, he scored with a wrist shot from the wing. He later recorded his first career NHL assist in a game on 2 November. After originally wearing jersey number 41 in the NHL, he later switched to number 11.

On 15 January 2009, Tlustý registered an NHL career-high of three points, all assists, in a game against the Carolina Hurricanes. The next month, on 18 February, after being reassigned to the Marlies, Tlustý scored five goals on just five shots in a game against the Syracuse Crunch, setting a franchise record for most goals scored in one game by a Marlies player, and the first player to score five goals in an AHL game since Jarkko Immonen did so in 2006. On 4 March, still with the Marlies, Tlustý set another franchise record, this time for most points in a game against the Providence Bruins; he finished with two goals and four assists for six points in a 6–4 Marlies victory.

On 3 December 2009, during the 2009–10 season, Tlustý was traded to the Carolina Hurricanes in exchange for forward Philippe Paradis. Tlustý scored his first goal for the Hurricanes on 11 December 2009, against the Washington Capitals in his first game for the club. On 1 July 2010, he signed a one-year, one-way contract with Carolina worth US$500,000. On 1 July 2011, Tlustý again signed a one-year, one-way contract with Carolina, this time worth US$525,000.

Tlustý set career-highs of 18 goals and 36 points during the 2011–12 season and was subsequently re-signed by the Hurricanes to a two-year, $3.2 million contract extension.

Tlustý again set a new career-high in goals (23) and points (38) during the lockout-shortened 2012–13 season. Tlustý, playing alongside NHL All-Stars Eric Staal and Alexander Semin, discovered a new-found scoring touch that led him to finish tied for fifth in goal-scoring in the NHL.

On 25 February 2015, during the 2014–15 season and with Tlustý in the final year of his contract and with the Hurricanes out of Stanley Cup playoff contention, he was traded to the Winnipeg Jets in exchange for a third-round draft pick in 2016 and a conditional sixth-round draft pick in 2015.

On 16 September 2015, Tlustý signed a one-year, one-way contract with the New Jersey Devils. In the 2015–16 season with the Devils, Tlustý was hampered with injury and a lack of productivity in a depth role, recording lows of 2 goals and 4 points in 30 games.

As an un-signed free agent over the following summer, on 20 September 2016, Tlustý agreed to a professional try-out contract to participate in the training camp of the Colorado Avalanche. He was subsequently released from his try-out with the Avalanche after failing to pass the initial medical and physical test. On 31 October 2016, Tlustý signed a try-out contract with Finnish based, Oulun Kärpät of the Liiga. He appeared in 14 games in Kärpät before he was released following his trial period due to lingering injury on 12 December 2016.

Personal

In mid-November 2007, photos of Tlustý, one of which was of him nude, appeared on the Internet, causing a media frenzy. Tlustý took the photos with his cell phone while still playing for Sault Ste. Marie the previous season. The photos of Tlustý first appeared on Canadian gossip site isthishappening.com, after which Tlustý retained the Toronto law firm Adair Morse, which began threatening some websites that had put the photos up with legal action. He issued a press release saying, "I used poor judgment in this instance and I have learned a valuable lesson." A second set of photos, reportedly taken during a night at a bar, was also circulating on the Internet. One photo showed Tlustý with his tongue out towards a male friend who was leaning in over his shoulder. This photo was published as the full-front page photo of the 14 November 2007, issue of the Toronto Sun.

Career statistics

Regular season and playoffs

International

References

External links

1988 births
Living people
Albany River Rats players
Carolina Hurricanes players
Charlotte Checkers (2010–) players
Czech expatriate ice hockey players in Canada
Czech expatriate ice hockey players in the United States
Czech ice hockey left wingers
Rytíři Kladno players
National Hockey League first-round draft picks
New Jersey Devils players
Oulun Kärpät players
People from Slaný
Sault Ste. Marie Greyhounds players
Toronto Maple Leafs draft picks
Toronto Maple Leafs players
Toronto Marlies players
Winnipeg Jets players
Sportspeople from the Central Bohemian Region
Czech expatriate ice hockey players in Finland